Radio Teesdale was a community radio station in Barnard Castle, County Durham, serving the Teesdale area of England and owned and operated by Teesdale Community Broadcasting Limited, a not-for-profit community group.

Radio Teesdale could be heard on FM radio on the frequencies 102.1 and 105.5 FM in the Teesdale area.  It can be heard on-line on the web site at http://www.radioteesdale.co.uk/

References

External links

Station blog

Community radio stations in the United Kingdom
Radio stations in North East England
County Durham